John Luce may refer to:
 John Luce (bishop) (died 1370), bishop of Dunkeld
 John Luce (Royal Navy officer) (1870–1932) 
 John V. Luce (1920–2011), Irish classicist and professor
 John G. Luce (1862–1935), American banker and politician